National Football Championship may refer to:

Association Football
 National Football Championship (Bangladesh)
 Korean National Football Championship
 National Football Championship of Romania

American Football
 NJCAA National Football Championship